Nowe Resko  (formerly German Ritzig) is a village in the administrative district of Gmina Połczyn-Zdrój, within Świdwin County, West Pomeranian Voivodeship, in north-western Poland.

For the history of the region, see History of Pomerania.

References

Nowe Resko